Rachel Loveridge (born 5 July 1980) is a retired British rower who participated in the women's eights in international level events.

References

1980 births
Living people
Sportspeople from Swindon
English female rowers
European Rowing Championships medalists